Eileen O'Higgins is an Irish actress. Her breakthrough role was in the play Hold Your Tongue, Hold Your Dead which led to a supporting role in the film Brooklyn (2015) and Mary Queen of Scots (2018).

Early life
Born Eileen O'Higgins on 22nd January, 1987 in Castlewellan, Co. Down, Northern Ireland, UK where she grew up. She attended St. Malachy's Primary School and Assumption Grammar School in Ballynahinch, County Down. O'Higgins later studied at the Royal Welsh College of Music & Drama in Cardiff.

Career
After graduating, O'Higgins starred in the BBC television miniseries adaptation Emma, and the television film Enid based on the life of Enid Blyton with Helena Bonham Carter (both in 2009). She then appeared in theatre productions including Alice Birch's And Then There Were Four Little Beats of Four Little Hearts on the Edge of the World at The Old Vic.
Her breakthrough role was a supporting role as a young pregnant woman in the play Hold Your Tongue, Hold Your Dead. A reviewer for The Harvard Crimson commented that her performance "conveyed an urgency... that was immediate and relatable". Her appearance helped her to be cast in a supporting role in her first film Brooklyn (2015) which also starred Saoirse Ronan. O'Higgins then appeared in the BBC television series My Mother and Other Strangers (2016). O’Higgins reteamed with Ronan in the film Mary Queen of Scots playing Scottish noblewoman Mary Beaton.

In the early 2020s, she appeared in the crime drama series Dead Still (2020) and the film Misbehaviour (2020), starring Keira Knightley, followed by roles in the Netflix series The Irregulars (2021) and the Epix series Billy the Kid.

Personal life
O’Higgins is best friends with fellow actress Saoirse Ronan, whom she first met during the filming of Brooklyn in 2014.

Filmography

Film

Television

References

External links
 
 EXCLUSIVE | 'Billy the Kid' star Eileen O'Higgins on bringing Kathleen to life at MEAWW

Alumni of the Royal Welsh College of Music & Drama
Film actresses from Northern Ireland
Stage actresses from Northern Ireland
Living people
People from County Down
Place of birth missing (living people)
Year of birth missing (living people)
Television actresses from Northern Ireland
21st-century actresses from Northern Ireland